Camiola Turinga was a Sicilian woman who was the wife of Roland of Sicily.

Roland of Sicily

References 
Shakespeare's Heroines: Characteristics of Women, Moral, Poetical,Shakespeare's Heroines: Characteristics of Women, Moral, and Poetical, pp. 59–62, By Jameson Anna
Noble Deeds of Woman; Or, Examples of Female Courage and Virtue By Elizabeth Starling, p. 357, Hale and Whiting (1881), original at New York public library.
A Serious Occupation: Literary Criticism by Victorian Women Writers By Solveig C. Robinson, pp. 19–21, Broadview Press (2003), 
The Myth of Pope Joan By Alain Boureau, p. 209, translated by Lydia G. Cochrane, Published 2001, University of Chicago Press,  
Virginia Brown's translation of Giovanni Boccaccio's Famous Women, pp 223 – 229; Harvard University Press, 2001; 
Ghisalberti, Alberto M. Dizionario Biografico degli Italiani: III Ammirato – Arcoleo. Rome, 1961.

Other uses 
The English playwright Philip Massinger based one of his best characters of The Maid of Honour on Boccaccio's heroine Camiola.

14th-century Italian women
14th-century Sicilian people
People from Messina
House of Barcelona (Sicily)